James Ernest Elder Wills (1900–1970) was a British person who had a lengthy career in the film industry.

He mainly worked as an art director, but he also worked in other roles, including director.

Films he was involved in include Tiger Bay, The Quatermass Xperiment, and The Men of Sherwood Forest.

He was a colonel during the Second World War who worked in I.S.R.B. designing, signing and building camouflaged explosive devices for agents operating against the Germans and Japanese. The story he wrote for the film Against the Wind was based upon his wartime experiences.

Selected filmography
 The First Mrs. Fraser (1932) - Art Director
 Holiday Lovers (1932) - Art Director
 Tiger Bay (1934) - Director
 Honeymoon for Three (1935) - Art Director
 Everything in Life (1936) - Director
 Sporting Love (1936) - Director
 Song of Freedom (1936) - Director
 Big Fella (1937) - Director
 Look Before You Love (1948) - Art Director
 Against the Wind (1948) - Story and Art Director
 The Men of Sherwood Forest (1954) - Art Director
 The Quatermass Xperiment (1955) - Art Director

References

External links
 

British film directors
1900 births
1970 deaths